The following is a list of Fremantle Football Club leading goalkickers in each season of the Australian Football League (AFL) and AFL Women's.

AFL leading goalkickers

AFL Women's leading goalkickers

References
General

 

Specific

Goalkickers
Australian Football League awards
Australian rules football-related lists
Fremantle-related lists